Nelapattu is a small village in Tirupati district, Andhra Pradesh, India. It is within 10 km of the town of Sullurpeta. It is best known for the Nelapattu Bird Sanctuary.

This bird sanctuary has a large nesting colony of spot-billed pelicans.

References 

Villages in Nellore district